Kerry Brown may refer to:

Kerry Brown (American football) (born 1985), American football guard
Kerry Brown (wrestler) (1958–2009), Canadian professional wrestler
Kerry Brown (musician) (born 1963), American drummer for the band Catherine and producer of The Smashing Pumpkins
Kerry Brown (historian) (born 1967), British academic, director of the Lau China Institute at King's College, London

See also
Carrie Brown (disambiguation)